Grabiner is a surname. Notable people with the surname include:

Anthony Grabiner, Baron Grabiner (born 1945), British barrister, academic administrator, and life peer 
Harry Grabiner (1890–1948), American baseball executive
Judith Grabiner (born 1938), American mathematician and historian